Rollinia fendleri is a species of plant in the Annonaceae family. It is endemic to Venezuela.

References

fendleri
Endemic flora of Venezuela
Least concern plants
Near threatened biota of South America
Taxonomy articles created by Polbot
Taxobox binomials not recognized by IUCN